Luigi Ossola (June 9, 1938 – July 7, 2018) was an Italian professional football player.

He played for 4 seasons (76 games, 7 goals) in the Serie A for A.S. Varese 1910 and A.S. Roma.

His younger brother Aldo Ossola was a very successful basketball player.

References

1938 births
2018 deaths
Italian footballers
Serie A players
S.S.D. Varese Calcio players
A.S. Roma players
Mantova 1911 players
Association football midfielders
Sportspeople from Varese
Footballers from Lombardy